Stoufferstown is an unincorporated community in Franklin County, in the U.S. state of Pennsylvania.

History
Stoufferstown got its start in the 1790s when Abraham Stouffer (son of Jacob and Magdelen (Hess) Stouffer) built a mill at the site.

References

Unincorporated communities in Franklin County, Pennsylvania
Unincorporated communities in Pennsylvania